Tom Judson (born November 14, 1960) is an American musical theatre actor and composer, particularly for off-Broadway plays, and a retired pornographic film actor. His credits include writing music for the films Metropolitan, Good Money and The Incredibly True Adventure of Two Girls in Love, as well as performing on Broadway and in national stage tours of the musicals 42nd Street and Cabaret.

In 1999 he embarked on a gay pornographic career under the stage name of Gus Mattox. He retired from the pornography industry in 2007 to concentrate on his career as an actor and musician. As Mattox, he received the 2006 GayVN Awards Performer of the Year Award for his work in the industry.

Judson wrote and performed his autobiographical one-man show Canned Ham from 2009 to 2011. Much of the material from that show was collected into his book of essays Laid Bare. Since 2011 Judson has continued performing his own cabaret act and has served as musical director and Second Banana for Charles Busch's cabaret act.

Selected videography

See also
 List of male performers in gay porn films

References

External links
 
 Featured article from the New York Times
 Featured article from The Advocate
 Tom Judson's Canned Ham blog

 

1960 births
Living people
American male musical theatre actors
American gay actors
American male pornographic film actors
American male composers
21st-century American composers
Male actors from New York (state)
People from Goshen, New York
21st-century American male musicians